Anita Hegh is an Australian actress, known for starring as Ellen 'Mac' Mackenzie in the television series Stingers and most recently Bianca Grieve in Janet King.

Personal life 
Her father was Norwegian, and her mother is Estonian. Hegh has one brother, Arnold Hegh.

Hegh studied to be a teacher at Sydney University, where she joined the Sydney University Dramatic Society. After auditioning for and being accepted into the National Institute of Dramatic Art, in Sydney, she changed her career path.  Hegh studied drama at the National Institute of Dramatic Art, graduating in 1994, and has rarely been out of work since.

Career 
After minor roles in Così (1996), Paradise Road (1997) and the children's television series Return to Jupiter, Hegh became well-known starring as Ellen 'Mac' Mackenzie on Stingers.

Hegh received an Australian Film Institute Award for Best Actress in a Supporting Role, for her work in MDA. Other television credits include Last Man Standing, Valentine's Day, The Informant, Carlotta, Deep Water, My Place, McLeod's Daughters, Rescue Special Ops and Time of our Lives. She played a major role in two series of Janet King as Janet’s colleague and lesbian lover, Bianca Grieve.

Her film credits include Stuffed, Maiden and Last Ride with Hugo Weaving.

Hegh works extensively in theatre. She won both a Helpmann and Sydney Theatre Award for The Wild Duck at Belvoir Street Theatre. She also won a Sydney theatre award for The City at the Sydney Theatre Company.

In 2017, after completing the second season of Janet King for the ABC, Hegh worked for the Sydney Theatre Company in Cloud Nine and also The Father (touring Melbourne Theatre Company) in 2017.

She won the 2018 Helpmann Award for Best Female Actor in a Supporting Role in a Play for her role in The Resistible Rise of Arturo Ui.

References

External links 

 Anita Hegh Fan Anita Hegh Fan page
 The Yellow Wallpaper page at Malthouse Theatre.
 A short overview of Ellen 'Mac' Mackenzie character (Archived 2009-10-25) in Stingers, Stingers Undercover.

1972 births
Living people
AACTA Award winners
Australian people of Scandinavian descent
Australian people of Norwegian descent
Australian people of Estonian descent
Australian television actresses
Helpmann Award winners
National Institute of Dramatic Art alumni
University of Sydney alumni